Chioma Okereke  is a Nigerian-born poet, author and short story writer. Her debut novel, Bitter Leaf (2010), was shortlisted for the Commonwealth Writers' Prize – Africa Best First Book 2011.

Biography

Okereke was born in Benin City, Nigeria. She moved to Britain at the age of six and attended several boarding-schools, before completing her sixth-form education at North London Collegiate School in Canons, Middlesex. Okereke graduated with an LLB degree from University College London.

A poet and short story writer who performed internationally, Okereke had her early work published in Bum Rush The Page and Callaloo literary magazine. She was shortlisted for the Undiscovered Authors Competition in 2006, as well as for the Daily Telegraph's Write a Novel in a Year Competition 2007.

Her debut novel Bitter Leaf was published in 2010 by Virago Press and was shortlisted for the Commonwealth Writers' Prize - Africa Best First Book 2011.

Her short story "Trompette de la Mort" was First Runner up for the inaugural Costa Short Story Award in the 2012 Costa Book Awards and her work was included in the Virago is 40 anthology (2013).

External links
 Official website
 The Soho Agency - Chioma Okereke

References 

Year of birth missing (living people)
Living people
People from Benin City
Nigerian emigrants to the United Kingdom
Black British women writers
Nigerian women novelists
21st-century Nigerian novelists
21st-century Nigerian women writers
English-language poets
Costa Book Award winners
Igbo novelists
Igbo poets
Igbo short story writers
Igbo women writers
Nigerian women short story writers
Nigerian short story writers
Nigerian women poets
English people of Nigerian descent
Magic realism writers
Igbo people